Moyeni is the capital city or camptown of Quthing District in Lesotho. Quthing was established in 1877, abandoned in the Gun War of 1880, and then rebuilt at its present site – the southernmost town in Lesotho. It has a population of 27,314 (2016 census).

Quthing district is home to a diverse group of people who speak different languages. King Moorosi, the leader of the Baphuthi people, who occupied the Quthing District in southeastern Basutoland (today's Lesotho) in the 1800s, died on Mount Moorosi in 1879 in a war against the Cape Colony. A full description of the war and the events that led up to it are available in "'Moorosi: A South African king's battle for survival'" by Graham Fysh. See http://www.moorosi.com.

Impressive rock and cave art are to be found near Quthing, which were created by the San people who settled in this area. Quthing lies in the southern part of Lesotho and borders the Eastern Cape province of South Africa. The Senqu River flows through the district of Quthing as it makes its long journey to the Atlantic Ocean. The border post between Lesotho and South Africa is called Tele Bridge.

During King Moshoeshoe's reign he allocated this part of the country mostly to the Baphuthi people led by King Moorosi.

References

External links

Populated places in Quthing District